Taju may refer to:

Taju-ye Sofla
Taju-ye Vosta